This is a list of Statutory rules made in the Northern Ireland in the year 2020.

1-100

101-200

201-360

See also

List of Acts of the Northern Ireland Assembly from 2020
List of Acts of the Parliament of the United Kingdom from 2020

References

Law of Northern Ireland
Law of the United Kingdom
2020
2020 in British law
2020 in British politics
Northern Ireland
Northern Ireland law-related lists